Marumba nympha is a species of moth of the family Sphingidae. It is known from India.

References

Marumba
Moths described in 1903